The Kosovar Superliga is the name of the handball league of Kosovo.

Competition format 

The season begins with a regular season between the ten teams. The first six teams qualifies for a first play-off round, while the last four plays a play-down round. At the end of this second round, the first four teams plays elimination rounds.

2020/21 Season participants 

The following 10 clubs compete in the Superliga during the 2020/21 season.

The following 10 clubs compete in the First League during the 2020–21 season.

Superliga past champions

Yugoslav regional championship 
Until 1991, Kosovo was part of Yugoslavia. The Handball Federation of Kosovo does not consider the title before this date because some teams played (Borac, Trepça, Bozhuri, Prishtina, Vëllaznimi, Samadrexha, Kosova) in first or second Yugoslav League and hence did not play Kosovo first league.

 1955 : Normalisti
 1956 : Normalisti (2)
 1957 : Normalisti (3)
 1958 : Normalisti (4)
 1959 : Normalisti (5)
 1960 : Normalisti (6)
 1961 : Buduçnosti
 1962 : KH Vëllazmini
 1963 : KH Vëllazmini (2)
 1964 : Prizreni
 1965 : KH Kosova
 1966 : Obiliqi
 1967 : KH Bozhuri
 1968 : KH Trepça
 1969 : KH Vëllazmini (3)
 1970 : KH Drenica
 1971 : KH Vëllazmini (4)
 1972 : Obiliqi (2)
 1973 : KH Bozhuri (2)
 1974 : KH Bozhuri (3)
 1975 : KH Trepça (2)
 1976 : KH Prishtina
 1977 : KH Vëllazmini (5)
 1978 : Samadrexha
 1979 : KH Vëllazmini (6)
 1980 : KH Deçani
 1981 : KNI Ramiz Sadiku
 1982 : KH Kosova (2)
 1983 : KH Vëllazmini (7)
 1984 : KH Bozhuri (4)
 1985 : KH Vëllazmini (8)
 1986 : KH Bozhuri (5)
 1987 : KH Kosova (3)
 1988 : KH Vëllazmini (9)
 1989 : KH Prishtina (2)
 1990 : KH Trepça (3)
 1991 : Buduçnosti (2)

Kosovar national championship 
According to Handball Federation of Kosovo, the first Kosovar national championship was played in 1991/92.

 1992 : KH Kastrioti
 1993 : KH Kastrioti (2)
 1994 : KH Trepça
 1995 : KH Prishtina
 1996 : KH BESA (1)
 1997 : KH BESA (2)
 1998 : KH Drita (6)
 1999 : not held because of the Kosovo War
 2000 : KH Kastrioti (3)
 2001 : KH Trepça (2)
 2002 : KH BESA (3)
 2003 : KH BESA (4)
 2004 : KH BESA (5)
 2005 : KH BESA Famiglia (6)
 2006 : KH BESA Famiglia (7)
 2007 : KH BESA Famiglia (8)
 2008 : KH Prishtina (2)
 2009 : KH Prishtina (3)
 2010 : KH Kastrioti (4)
 2011 : KH Kastrioti (5)
 2012 : KH BESA Famiglia (9)
 2013 : KH Prishtina (4)
 2014 : KH BESA Famiglia (10)
 2015 : KH BESA Famiglia (11)
 2016 : KH BESA Famiglia (12)
 2017 : KH BESA FamGas (13)
 2018 : KH BESA FamGas (14)
 2019 : KH BESA FamGas (15)
 2020 : KH BESA FamGas (16)
 2021 : KH BESA FamGas (17)
 2022 : KH BESA FamGas (18)

Kosovar Cup winners

 1992 : Kastrioti
 1993 : Prishtina
 1994 : Trepça
 1995 : Llapi
 1996 : Besa 
 1997 : Vëllaznimi
 1998 : not held
 1999 : not held
 2000 : Prizreni
 2001 : Prishtina (2)
 2002 : Trepça (2)
 2003 : Besa (2)
 2004 : Kastrioti (2)
 2005 : Besa (3)
 2006 : Kastrioti (3)
 2007 : Kastrioti (4)
 2008 : Prishtina (3)
 2009 : Kastrioti (5)
 2010 : Besa Famiglia (4)
 2011 : Besa Famiglia (5)
 2012 : Besa Famiglia (6)
 2013 : Prishtina (4)
 2014 : Besa Famiglia (7)
 2015 : Besa Famiglia (8)
 2016 : Besa Famiglia (9)
 2017 : Besa FamGas (10)
 2018 : Besa FamGas (11)
 2019 : Kastrioti (6)
 2020 : Besa Famgas (12)
 2021 : Besa Famgas (13)

EHF coefficient ranking
For season 2017/2018, see footnote:

27.  (36)  Olís deildin (7.00)
28.  (34)  Meistriiliga (6.83)
29.  (29)  Superliga (6.67)
30.  (21)  Sales Lentz League (6.00)
30.  (25)  Ligat Winner (6.00)

Superliga Woman past champion

Yugoslav regional championship 

 1972 : Buduçnosti
 1973 : Prishtina
 1974 : Trepça
 1975 : Ibri
 1976 : Kastrioti
 1977 : Deçani
 1978 : Mokra Gora
 1979 : Trepça (2)
 1980 : Vushtrria
 1981 : Prizreni
 1982 : Vëllaznimi
 1983 : Prishtina (2)
 1984 : Deçani (2)
 1985 : Deçani (3)
 1986 : Trepça (3)
 1987 : Prishtina (3)
 1988 : Samadrexha
 1989 : Elektroekonomia
 1990 : Samadrexha (2)
 1991 : Trepça (4)

Kosovar national championship 
According to Handball Federation of Kosovo, the first Kosovar national championship was played in 1991/92.

 1992 :
 1993 :
 1994 :
 1995 : Vjosa 
 1996 : Vjosa (2)
 1997 : Prishtina
 1998 : Samadrexha
 1999 : not held because of the Kosovo War
 2000 : Kastrioti 
 2001 : Kastrioti (2)
 2002 : Kastrioti (3)
 2003 : Kastrioti (4)
 2004 : Vushtrria
 2005 : Vushtrria (2)
 2006 : Samadrexha (2)
 2007 : Samadrexha (3)
 2008 : Vushtrria (3)
 2009 : Vushtrria (4)
 2010 : Prishtina (2)
 2011 : Prishtina (3)
 2012 : Prishtina (4)
 2013 : Kastrioti (5)
 2014 : Kastrioti (6)
 2015 : Kastrioti (7)
 2016 : Prishtina (5)
 2017 : Prishtina (6)
 2018 : Shqiponja
 2019 : Istogu
 2020 : Ferizaj
 2021 : Vushtrria (5)
 2022 : Istogu (2)

References

Superliga
Kosovo
Sports leagues established in 1955
1955 establishments in Kosovo